Lewisia maguirei is a rare species of flowering plant in the family Montiaceae known by the common name Maguire's lewisia, or Maguire's bitterroot. It is endemic to Nevada in the United States, where it is known only from eastern Nye County.

Description
This is a perennial herb growing at ground level, the stem no more than 2 centimeters long. It grows from a taproot. The fleshy lance-shaped leaves are 1 or 2 centimeters long but wither by flowering. The inflorescence contains 2 or 3 flowers. Each flower has 3 or 4 wide white or pinkish sepals and up to 9 white or pink-tinged petals each roughly a centimeter long. Blooming occurs in summer.

Distribution and habitat
It grows on rocky clay and limestone slopes in open pinyon-juniper woodland at elevations around 2240 to 2525 meters. Other plants in the habitat include desert green gentian (Frasera albomarginata), Torrey's milkvetch (Astragalus calycosus), stemless four-nerved daisy (Tetraneuris acaulis), Nevada onion (Allium nevadense), and rock goldenrod (Petradoria pumila).

Conservation
There are only 8 known occurrences of this plant, all within an eight-kilometer radius. It is threatened by poaching, as it is attractive to collectors of alpine plants. Its rugged, high-elevation habitat helps to protect it from other threats.

References

maguirei
Flora of Nevada
Natural history of Nye County, Nevada
Endemic flora of the United States
Plants described in 1954
Critically endangered flora of the United States